Fagnano Alto is a comune and town in the province of L'Aquila in the Abruzzo region of Italy.

Transport 
Fagnano has a station on the Terni–Sulmona railway, with trains to L'Aquila and Sulmona.

References